The Nord Pingouin (Auk) was a French-built, re-engined Messerschmitt Bf 108 Taifun produced by SNCAN (Société Nationale de Constructions Aéronautiques du Nord).

Development
In 1942 the manufacture of the Messerschmitt Bf 108 was transferred to SNCAN (usually known as Nord) at Les Mureaux in occupied France. Before the liberation, 170 Bf 108s were built and Nord continued to build the aircraft using scavenged Bf 108 airframe parts as the Nord 1000, until stocks of German Argus engines were exhausted. The type was then re-engined with a 233 hp (174 kW) Renault 6Q-11 six-cylinder inline engine and was designated the Nord 1001 Pingouin I. A further update followed with a Renault 6Q-10 powered variant which was designated the Nord 1002 Pingouin II.  Total production was 286 with the majority used as communications and liaison aircraft with the French armed forces.

The design was further developed with the tricycle landing gear Nord Noralpha.

Design
The Pingouin was a low-wing cantilever monoplane with a braced trimmable horizontal tail surface with elevators, and a single fin and rudder. It had a tailwheel landing gear with outward-retracting main gear. The engine was nose-mounted and the Pingouin had an enclosed cabin that seated four in two rows of two. Like the Bf 108, the wings had automatic leading edge slats and could be folded when the aircraft was on the ground, allowing the complete aircraft to be transported by rail.

Variants
1000
French-built Bf 108.
1001 Pingouin I
Renault 6Q-11 powered variant.
1002 Pingouin II
Renault 6Q-10 powered variant.

Operators

French Air Force
French Army
French Navy

Specifications (1002)

See also

References

External links

 Aircraft World Directory

1940s French military utility aircraft
Pingouin
Single-engined tractor aircraft
Low-wing aircraft
Aircraft first flown in 1944